Leenhouts is a Dutch surname. Notable people with the surname include:
 Paul Leenhouts, Dutch musician
 Pieter Willem Leenhouts (1926–2004), Dutch botanist
 Nelson and Norman Leenhouts, creators of Home Properties

Dutch-language surnames